The Infiniti LE is a concept car developed by the Infiniti division of Nissan Motors and was revealed to the public at the 2012 New York Auto Show. The LE names comes from Luxury first and Electric second.
An Infiniti spokesperson said the vehicle shown is a "production intent" concept and will be on the market in 2014. In May 2013 the company said that it was waiting for inductive charging industry standards before launching the vehicle.

The Infiniti LE Concept is based on the Nissan Leaf platform. Like the Leaf, the LE will also utilize a 24 kWh or larger lithium-ion battery pack mounted below the passenger compartment. The LE would mark the brand's first front-wheel drive car since the 2004 Infiniti I35 if the car goes into production.

A key feature of the LE is its inductive wireless charging. The vehicle can be charged by parking it over a charge point located in the floor, rather than plugging into an electrical outlet. However, the LE can also be charged through its CHAdeMO DC50kW quick charger.

In June 2013, Infiniti CEO Johan de Nysschen said the Infiniti LE was on hold indefinitely as the Infiniti brand was attempting to triple sales by the 2017 fiscal year. 

In July 2013, Nissan's head of global planning Andy Palmer said the LE is "not significantly" on hold, but delayed "a little bit" so that Infiniti can incorporate some "interesting advances in electric technology" like new lithium ion battery technology that will increase range and lower the price.

In July 2014, the LE was reported as in development again. Patents for a more production-ready design for the LE were also found later that year. However, in October 2015, the company again reversed their strategy saying it will not have such a car in its line up until 2020, at the earliest.

References

External links
 All Infiniti cars to be electrified by 2021, either hybrid or pure electric

LE